In mathematics, monus is an operator on certain commutative monoids that are not groups. A commutative monoid on which a monus operator is defined is called a commutative monoid with monus, or CMM. The monus operator may be denoted with the − symbol because the natural numbers are a CMM under subtraction; it is also denoted with the  symbol to distinguish it from the standard subtraction operator.

Notation

Definition 
Let  be a commutative monoid. It is easy to check that  is reflexive and that it is transitive.  is called naturally ordered if the  relation is additionally antisymmetric and hence a partial order.

There are also examples of monoids which are naturally ordered but are not semirings with monus.

Other structures 

Beyond monoids, the notion of monus can be applied to other structures. For instance, a naturally ordered semiring (sometimes called a dioid) is a semiring where the commutative monoid induced by the addition operator is naturally ordered. When this monoid is a commutative monoid with monus, the semiring is called a semiring with monus, or m-semiring.

Examples 

Natural numbers 
The natural numbers including 0 form a commutative monoid with monus, with their ordering being the usual order of natural numbers and the monus operator being a saturating variant of standard subtraction, variously referred to as truncated subtraction, limited subtraction, proper subtraction, doz (difference or zero), and monus. Truncated subtraction is usually defined as

where − denotes standard subtraction. For example, 5 − 3 = 2 and 3 − 5 = −2 in regular subtraction, whereas in truncated subtraction 3 ∸ 5 = 0. Truncated subtraction may also be defined as

In Peano arithmetic, truncated subtraction is defined in terms of the predecessor function  (the inverse of the successor function):

A definition that does not need the predecessor function is:

Truncated subtraction is useful in contexts such as primitive recursive functions, which are not defined over negative numbers. Truncated subtraction is also used in the definition of the multiset difference operator.

Properties 
The class of all commutative monoids with monus form a variety. The equational basis for the variety of all CMMs consists of the axioms for commutative monoids, as well as the following axioms:

Notes 

Algebraic structures